Astrakhan Russian is an umbrella term for the  regional varieties of the Russian language spoken in Astrakhan Oblast, a federal subject of Russia. Astrakhan Oblast is one of the most diverse parts of the country in terms of ethnic groups and languages. The major groups are ethnic Russians (61% of the population), Kazakhs (17%) and Tatars (7%), but many others are also present and influence the shared local identity, culture and language varieties.

Being a regional rather than linguistic unity, Astrakhan Russian is a term for a broad group of dialects varying between speakers depending on their ethnicity, native language, age, education, occupation, location within the region and other social factors. Nevertheless, they share certain traits and can be grouped into a few categories.

The main divide is that between Russians and people of other ethnic groups, as the speech of the latter is influenced by the vernacular languages of their communities. Astrakhan Russian as spoken by Kazakh people is noticeably influenced by the Kazakh language on most levels, and this is not limited to native Kazakh speakers. It is not uncommon for people of minority background to grow up in an ethnically and linguistically diverse town or city in the region speaking only Russian, but their Russian typically still has traces of their heritage language.

Vocabulary 

One of the things that unite Astrakhan Russian speakers of all ethnic backgrounds is a group of local words that do not exist in standard Russian and other Russian dialects or have different meanings in them. In many cases these words originate from Turkic languages. Here are some examples:

  'crow'; this word exists in standard Russian and most Russian dialects, but only as a pejorative way to refer to an elderly woman. Its origin in Astrakhan Russian and other dialects is the same, both words come from Turkic  'crow', but Astrakhan Russian preserved its original meaning, whereas other varieties only use it as a metaphor;
  'untidy person'; this word originates from Kazakh  'pig'. A similar word exists in other Russian dialects, but stress falls on the other syllable (second in Astrakhan, first elsewhere), and the meanings vary;
 'eggplant'; origin unknown;
  'gathering (of family or friends)'; unique to Astrakhan Russian, Turkic origin;
  'small river'; this word exists in standard Russian but originates from the Astrakhan region; Turkic origin;
  'small desert lake'; unique to Astrakhan Russian as a common noun, only exists elsewhere as a toponym.
  'lotus flower'; unique to Astrakhan Russian, origin unknown;
  'puddle'; unique to Astrakhan Russian, possibly Turkic origin.

See also 
 Varieties of the Russian language

References

Literature 

 Kondrashova, Olga (2014) Dialektizmy Astrahanskoj oblasti.
 Losev, Gennady & Kirokosian, Mihail (2007) Astrahanskie slovečki. Astrahan: Čilim. 260 p.

Astrakhan Oblast
Languages of Russia
Russian dialects